Lisa M. Fairfax (born 1970) is an American legal scholar who is a Presidential Professor at the University of Pennsylvania Law School. She was previously Alexander Hamilton Professor of Business Law at the George Washington University Law School.

Early life and education 
Fairfax was raised by a single parent in Compton, California. She attended Harvard University and Harvard Law School, where she met and became friends with Ketanji Brown Jackson.

Career 
Fairfax began her teaching career at the University of Maryland School of Law, then joined the faculty of the George Washington University Law School in 2009, where she was Alexander Hamilton Professor of Business Law. Fairfax is affiliated with the Democratic Party. In October 2015, President Barack Obama nominated Fairfax to serve as a member of the U.S. Securities and Exchange Commission, though she was never confirmed. In 2020, Fairfax was elected a member of the American Law Institute. In 2021, Fairfax joined the University of Pennsylvania Law School and was named to a Presidential Professorship. After Ketanji Brown Jackson was nominated to serve on the Supreme Court in 2022, Fairfax made an introductory statement at Jackson's Senate confirmation hearing.

Personal life 
Fairfax is married to Roger Fairfax, a lawyer and dean of the Washington College of Law at American University. She has three children.

References

21st-century African-American academics
21st-century American academics
African-American legal scholars
American women legal scholars
American legal scholars
African-American women lawyers
George Washington University Law School faculty
University of Pennsylvania Law School faculty
Members of the American Law Institute
University of Maryland, Baltimore faculty
Harvard Law School alumni
Harvard College alumni
California lawyers
People from Compton, California
1970 births
Living people